Edward Dent may refer to:

Edward John Dent (1790–1853), clockmaker who designed Big Ben
Edward Joseph Dent (1876–1957), professor of music